Route 42 is a state highway in the U.S. state of New Jersey within the Camden area. It runs  from an intersection with U.S. Route 322 and County Route 536 Spur in Monroe Township, Gloucester County to an intersection with Interstate 76 and Interstate 295 in Bellmawr, Camden County. The route is a mix of freeway and divided four-lane arterial road. The southern portion of Route 42 is a local arterial route and one of several highways comprising the Black Horse Pike, a road that runs from Camden to Atlantic City. The northern portion is part of a six- to eight-lane freeway referred to locally as the North–South Freeway (or simply the 42 Freeway) that connects the Atlantic City Expressway to the Benjamin Franklin Bridge (via I-76 and I-676).  Major intersections along the route include the Atlantic City Expressway and the southern terminus of Route 168 in Turnersville, another intersection with Route 168 in Blackwood, and Route 41 and Route 55 in Deptford Township.

Route 42 was originally designated in 1927 to run along the Black Horse Pike between Ferry Avenue in Camden and the present U.S. Route 40/U.S. Route 322 split in the McKee City section of Hamilton Township, Atlantic County. In 1953, the southern terminus was cut back to its current terminus in the Williamstown section of Monroe Township to avoid the concurrency it shared with U.S. Route 322. After the completion of the North–South Freeway between Bellmawr and Turnersville in 1959, Route 42 was moved to this freeway, and the Black Horse Pike north of Turnersville became Route 168.

The freeway portion of Route 42 has been improved many times. Construction work has commenced on a project known as the "I-295/I-76/Route 42 Direct Connection," which is reconstructing the dangerous and congested Route 42/Interstate 295/Interstate 76 interchange in Bellmawr.

Route description

Black Horse Pike

Route 42 begins at an intersection with U.S. Route 322 and County Route 536 Spur in Monroe Township, Gloucester County where it heads to the north on the Black Horse Pike. For the first portion of the route, Route 42 is a divided four–lane arterial highway that intersects various local roads. Some intersections along this section feature jughandles.  There are also many businesses lining the highway. The route crosses County Route 689 (Berlin-Cross Keys Road) and enters  Washington Township. It then intersects the northern terminus of County Route 555 (Tuckahoe Road). After the intersection with County Route 555, Route 42 intersects three more county routes: County Route 655 (Fries Mill Road), County Route 639 (Ganttown Road), and County Route 651 (Greentree Road). The route meets the western terminus of the Atlantic City Expressway at an interchange, Route 168 continues to the north on the Black Horse Pike, and Route 42 becomes the six–lane North–South Freeway.

North–South Freeway

Upon becoming the North–South Freeway, Route 42 crosses into Gloucester Township, Camden County and comes to the first numbered exit for County Route 705, which provides access to Route 168. Following that, the freeway reaches the County Route 673 (College Drive) interchange, serving Camden County College to the east and the Gloucester Premium Outlets to the west. County Route 534 interchanges with a southbound exit and northbound entrance and then Coles Road interchanges with a northbound exit and southbound entrance. Next, Route 42 encounters Exits 9B and 10A for Route 168. Exit 9B serves northbound Route 168 and provides access to the New Jersey Turnpike, and Exit 10A serves southbound Route 168. County Route 681 interchanges after Route 168, with a southbound exit and northbound entrance, and Route 42 enters Gloucester County again in Deptford Township after crossing the South Branch of Big Timber Creek.

In Deptford Township, Route 41 interchanges with a northbound exit and an entrance in both directions. Past this interchange, County Route 544 interchanges with a southbound exit and an entrance in both directions. Both of these interchanges provide access to the Deptford Mall and, in the case of the Route 41 interchange, to Route 55 from northbound Route 42 since the northbound lanes have no direct access to Route 55. Route 42 meets the northern terminus of the Route 55 freeway at Exit 13 with a southbound exit and northbound entrance, where it widens to eight lanes. Route 42 crosses the Big Timber Creek into Runnemede, Camden County, where it passes over the New Jersey Turnpike without an interchange.  The freeway then enters Bellmawr, where it features right-in/right-out ramps with Leaf Avenue, that provide access to County Route 753 (Creek Road).  Route 42 then continues north to its terminus at Interstate 295 where the North–South Freeway becomes Interstate 76, which heads to Camden and Philadelphia.

The North–South Freeway portion of Route 42 is a major route for daily commuters from southern New Jersey to Philadelphia, Pennsylvania, via the Walt Whitman Bridge and Ben Franklin Bridge and weekend commuters from southeastern Pennsylvania to the southern Jersey Shore via Route 55 and the Atlantic City Expressway. Even though Route 42 ends at I-295, the north–south Freeway is sometimes called "Route 42" all the way to the Interstate 76/Interstate 676 split.

Snow removal, litter control, and landscaping of Route 42 between the end of the Atlantic City Expressway and Interstate 295 is performed by the South Jersey Transportation Authority.

History
In 1927, Route 42 was legislated to run along the Black Horse Pike, a road that traces its origins back to 1855. In that year, the Camden and Blackwoodstown Turnpike Company was established by entrepreneurs who had helped create the White Horse Pike to build a gravel road that would run from Camden south to Blackwoodtown and eventually to Atlantic City,  from Ferry Avenue in Camden to Route 48 (now U.S. Route 40) in McKee City.  By 1941, U.S. Route 322 was assigned to follow the routing of Route 42 between Williamstown and McKee City. With the 1953 New Jersey state highway renumbering, which eliminated long concurrencies between U.S. Routes and State Routes, the southern terminus of Route 42 was cut back to Williamstown to avoid the concurrency with U.S. Route 322.

The North–South Freeway portion of Route 42 was originally planned as a parkway in 1932 that would run from the Ben Franklin Bridge in Camden to Atlantic City; however, this proposal never materialized. In the late 1940s, the North–South Freeway was proposed by the New Jersey State Highway Department to run from the Ben Franklin Bridge to Turnersville. In the early 1950s, right-of-way for the freeway was acquired and actual construction of the freeway followed. The Route 42 freeway opened between Interstate 295 in Bellmawr and the Black Horse Pike in Blackwood in 1958. It opened between the Black Horse Pike in Blackwood and Turnersville in 1959. With the completion of the North–South Freeway portion of Route 42, the Black Horse Pike north of Turnersville became Route 168.

Following its completion, the North–South Freeway portion of Route 42 has seen many improvements. In 1965, the freeway was widened to six lanes for most of its length with the northernmost part being widened to eight lanes due to the completion of the Atlantic City Expressway and development occurring along the route. The route had its interchange with Route 55 open in 1985, when the Route 55 Freeway was opened from Route 42 to Route 41 to the south. Between 1996 and August 1999, the route was widened to eight lanes between Interstate 295 and Route 55 in Deptford Township. In the early 2000s, the interchanges with  Route 41 and County Route 544 in Deptford were rebuilt at a cost of $13 million to improve movements within the area. In October 2003, the New Jersey Department of Transportation (NJDOT) installed exit tabs along the stretch of the freeway portion of Route 42. On August 27, 2010, an interchange opened at County Route 673 (College Drive), providing better access to Camden County College.

Future
NJDOT has broken ground on the missing express connection between Interstate 295 and Route 42 to provide an easier connection between the Baltimore-Washington Metropolitan Area and points south to Atlantic City and vice versa. The project, dubbed the I-295/I-76/Route 42 Direct Connection, will reconstruct the dangerous and congested Route 42/Interstate 295/Interstate 76 interchange, which currently requires traffic on I-295 to use  ramps that merge onto the North–South Freeway for a short distance, among a series of other indirect connections. In 2007, "Alternative D" for the reconstructed interchange was selected, calling for I-295 to cross over the North–South Freeway. This interchange is projected to cost $900 million. Construction began in 2013 and is scheduled to be complete in 2024. NJDOT has long term plans for 2011–2020 to reconstruct the entire Route 42 freeway from the Atlantic City Expressway to I-295.

On May 12, 2009, New Jersey Governor Jon S. Corzine and the Delaware River Port Authority, the agency which manages the PATCO Speedline, announced plans for a Camden-Philadelphia BRT (bus rapid transit system) along the Route 42 freeway and the adjacent Route 55 freeway as part of a comprehensive transportation plan for South Jersey that would include a diesel light rail line between Camden and Glassboro, improvements to NJ Transit's Atlantic City Line, and enhanced connections to the Atlantic City International Airport.

Major intersections

See also

References

External links

An enlarged view of road jurisdiction at the confluence of I-76, I-295 and NJ 42
New Jersey Roads: Route 42
Speed Limits for Route 42

042
Limited-access roads in New Jersey
Freeways in the United States
Transportation in Camden County, New Jersey
Transportation in Gloucester County, New Jersey